Wenshu Temple ( or , may refer to:

 Wenshu Temple (Sunan County), in Sunan County, Gansu, China 

 Wenshu Temple (Pingdingshan), in Pingdingshan, Henan, China

 Wenshu Temple (Mount Wutai), on Mount Wutai, in Xinzhou, Shanxi, China  

 Wenshu Temple (Shuozhou), in Shuozhou, Shanxi, China

 Wenshu Temple (Suzhou), in Suzhou, Jiangsu, China

 Wenshu Temple (Jiedong County), in Jiedong County, Guangdong, China 

 Wenshu Temple (Chengdu), in Chengdu, Sichuan, China